Koyunlu is a village in the Yeşilli District of Mardin Province in Turkey. The village is populated by Kurds of the Surgucu tribe and had a population of 263 in 2021.

References 

Villages in Yeşilli District
Kurdish settlements in Mardin Province